Jorge Alonso Treviño Martínez (born 2 November 1935) served as governor of Nuevo León from 1 August 1985 to 1 August 1991. He is affiliated with the Institutional Revolutionary Party.

Treviño received a bachelor's degree in law from the National Autonomous University of Mexico, a doctorate in administrative law from the University of Paris (Panthéon-Sorbonne) and completed some postgraduate studies at the University of Rome in Italy.

He taught several law courses at the Monterrey Institute of Technology and Higher Education, Autonomous University of Nuevo León and University of Monterrey and held several posts at the federal secretariat of finance, where he worked with future president Miguel de la Madrid.

Treviño was elected to the Chamber of Deputies in 1982. He won the 1985 gubernatorial elections amid serious accusations of fraud, particularly against his conservative opponent, Fernando Canales. As governor, he built the first line of Metrorrey and coordinated the relief and reconstruction efforts after Hurricane Gilbert.

External links
 IEA: Jorge Treviño Martínez.

1935 births
Living people
Governors of Nuevo León
Institutional Revolutionary Party politicians
Members of the Chamber of Deputies (Mexico) for Nuevo León
Politicians from Monterrey
National Autonomous University of Mexico alumni
University of Paris alumni
Academic staff of the Monterrey Institute of Technology and Higher Education
Academic staff of the University of Monterrey
Academic staff of the Autonomous University of Nuevo León
20th-century Mexican politicians